Dennis is an unincorporated community in Putnam County, Georgia, United States. It lies at an elevation of 453 feet (138 m).

References

Unincorporated communities in Putnam County, Georgia
Unincorporated communities in Georgia (U.S. state)